Erich Zeigner (17 February 1886, in Erfurt – 5 April 1949, in Leipzig) was a German politician. He was Prime Minister of the German state of Saxony during the attempted communist uprising of 1923. 

In August 1921 Zeigner was Minister of Justice of Saxony. On 21 March 1923 he became the third prime minister of the Free State of Saxony. On 10 October 1923  he appointed two members of the Communist Party as members of the government. On 27 October 1923, German Chancellor Gustav Stresemann issued an ultimatum demanding a dismissal of the Communist ministers. Zeigner refused to comply and, two days later, was deposed as prime minister by the President of Germany  Friedrich Ebert (SPD) under the authority of Article 48 of the Weimar constitution. Zeigner was replaced by a commissioner.

On 21 November 1923 Zeigner was arrested for alleged corruption in office and sentenced in the spring of 1924 to three years in prison, from which he was released on probation in August 1925.  

In 1932, he signed the Urgent Appeal against the Nazi Party. He was arrested in August 1933 after the Nazis had come to power but acquitted at trial in 1935. Since then he had to live by doing odd jobs. 1939 re-imprisoned for a short time, he worked as a bookkeeper in Leipzig. After the failed attempt to assassinate Hitler on 20 July 1944, Zeigner and Stanislaw Trabalski, as well as Heinrich Fleißner, was kidnapped, and other Leipzig Solzialdemokraten were arrested in the Sachsenhausen concentration camp. In August 1944 he was arrested in Buchenwald concentration camp.

Zeigner returned to Leipzig in 1945, was in June/July 1945 legal council with the city administration in Leipzig and was appointed on 16 July 1945 by the commander of the Soviet military administration in Leipzig, Lieutenant General Nikolai Trufanov, as Lord Mayor of the city of Leipzig. He held this office until his death. In October 1946 he was confirmed as Lord Mayor by an election.

Zeigner died of natural causes on 5 April 1949. It has been suggested that after his dismissal, fear for his life and the welfare of his family prevented Zeigner from either resisting his dismissal at the time, or publicly denouncing the Nazi regime at a later date.

External links
 

1886 births
1949 deaths
Politicians from Erfurt
People from the Province of Saxony
Social Democratic Party of Germany politicians
Socialist Unity Party of Germany politicians
Members of the Volkskammer
Mayors of Leipzig
Weimar Republic politicians
Ministers-President of Saxony